The Australian Shepherd is a breed of herding dog from the United States. The name of the breed is technically a misnomer, as it was developed in California in the 19th century, although it has its origins in Asturias, in the northwest of Spain; the breed was unknown in Australia at the time. It is claimed that Australian Shepherds descend from a variety of herding breeds, including collies imported, alongside sheep, from Australia and New Zealand; the breed reportedly took its name from this trade. Originally used solely as a herding dog, the Australian Shepherd has become one of the most popular companion dog breeds in North America.

History

The Australian Shepherd descends in part from pastoral dogs brought to herd Spanish flocks in North America as early as the 1500s. There is some speculation that these dogs included the Carea Leonés, a mountain sheepdog that can display the eye color and merle coat found in many contemporary Australian Shepherds. It is sometimes claimed that the Basque Shepherd Dog and the Pyrenean Sheepdog were also among the ancestors of the breed. The breed as it is known today developed in California in the 19th century, as a sheep herding dog for Californian shepherds. The Australian Shepherd is believed to have developed from a variety of herding dogs imported to California with sheep imports, including collies from Australia and New Zealand. It was from these ancestors that the breed took its name. 

The Australian Shepherd spread from California throughout the Western United States where it became extremely popular with ranchers who valued the breed’s sheep working qualities, as well as their ability to handle cattle and other livestock. A purely working breed for over a century, the Australian Shepherd was virtually unknown outside of the livestock industry until the mid-20th century when the breed was popularised by Jay Lister, a rodeo performer, at rodeos across the western states with his Australian Shepherds performing all manner of tricks. A breed club was soon formed to promote the breed, the Australian Shepherd Club of America, and kennel club recognition followed in 1979 when the breed was recognised by the United Kennel Club. The breed was subsequently recognised by the American Kennel Club in the 1990s and later the Fédération Cynologique International.

From the late-20th century the Australian Shepherd has increasingly been seen in conformation shows and it has become an extremely popular companion dog, in 2019 it was ranked by the American Kennel Club as the 15th most popular breed of dog in the United States.

Description

Appearance

The Australian Shepherd has a moderately long and wavy double coat that has a dense undercoat and coarse topcoat; the coat is short on the face and well feathered on the rear of the legs. The breed is known for its unique colorations and variable coat patterns, it being said no two dogs sharing a coat. The breed standard allows for blue merle, red merle, solid black or solid red, with or without white markings and with or without tan points.

Examples of the breed can be born with long or naturally bobbed (short) tails; traditionally long tailed dogs had their tails docked, although some countries outside of the United States do not allow docking and so some long tailed and partial bob tails are allowed to be exhibited in those countries.

Temperament
The Australian Shepherd is described as intelligent, active, loyal, protective, playful, and adaptive. The modern breed is predominantly bred for pets; despite this, many retain a strong herding instinct and it is not uncommon for companion dogs of the breed to try to herd children or other pets. A very active breed, the Australian Shepherd is known to become destructive if it does not receive adequate exercise.

Health
Australian Shepherds are generally a healthy breed, but they can have several health problems. Vision problems are common, and epilepsy is also a concern. In merle-to-merle breeding, the puppies that have inherited two copies of the merle gene have an increased risk of being born blind or deaf.

Mortality

The median lifespans for breeds similar in size to Australian Shepherds are mostly between 11 and 13 years, so, assuming the results of the UK study are not representative of the population there, Australian Shepherds appear to have a typical lifespan for a breed their size.

Results of a 1998 internet survey with a sample size of 614 Australian Shepherds indicated a median longevity around 12.5 years, but that longevity may be declining.

Morbidity
Based on a sample of 48 still-living dogs, the most common health concerns noted by owners were eye problems (red eye, epiphora, conjunctivitis, and cataracts).  Dermatological and respiratory problems also ranked high.

Collie eye anomaly (CEA) is rare in the breed, but it and cataracts are a concern in Aussies. Other conditions of note include iris coloboma, canine hip dysplasia, Pelger-Huet anomaly, hypothyroidism, and nasal solar dermatitis. Prior to breeding, the Aussie should be checked for hip and elbow dysplasia and DNA tests performed to show the dog to be free of the MDR1 mutation, cataract mutation, and CEA. Tests should also include those for thyroidism and clearances for other known eye diseases like colobomas, progressive retinal atrophy, and retinal folds.

Some Australian Shepherds (as well as Collies, German Shepherds, and many other herding dogs) are susceptible to a genetic mutation of the MDR1 gene. Dogs with the mutation can suffer toxicity from antiparasitics such as ivermectin in high doses, and other drugs.  A test is available to determine if a particular dog carries the mutated gene.

Hip dysplasia 
Hip dysplasia is a heritable condition where the femur does not fit securely in the pelvic socket of the hip joint. This problem can exist with or without clinical signs, meaning some dogs feel pain in one or both rear legs.

Double merle

Double merle or homozygous merle occurs when the offspring of two merled parents inherit two copies of the dominant merle gene. The odds of this are 25% for each pup born from such a litter. Double merles often have excessive light or white areas and can have hearing and vision problems as a result of having two copies of the merle gene. Homozygous merles can be deaf or blind, or express iris colobomas, retinal detachment, cataracts, persistent pupillary membrane, a displacement of the lens, equatorial staphyloma, night blindness and microphthalmia. Audio impairment or deafness usually develops after the birth of a puppy with their ear canal still closed. The white color of double merles is produced due to the lack of melanocytes which provide high potassium levels in the endolymph surrounding the cochlea's hair cells. There is no surgery or treatment that can reduce the damage. Loss of hearing is directly linked to the amount of pigmentation cells a dog has. The same pigment that is lacking in the ear can also be lacking in the eyes, affecting its development. Although many believe that only dogs with blue eyes have eye problems, it is not correct. Due to the contrast between eye problems and blue eyes, eye conditions in blue-eyed dogs are much easier to spot.

Not all homozygous merles are affected, but most are, making the breeding of two merles a very touchy subject. Some breeders euthanize mostly white pups, while others may attempt to sell them as "rare" white Aussies without disclosing the potential for health defects. A large percentage of homozygous merles sold eventually end up in rescue and shelters, as the average family is ill-prepared to take on a deaf or blind pet. However, deaf or blind Australian shepherds can make wonderful pets given a home prepared for their special needs. They are an intelligent breed, which generally learn hand signals with ease.

The term "lethal white" originated from horses born with lethal white syndrome, and has since evolved to often describe dogs born with the double merle trait. This trait is found in many breeds, but most commonly found in Australian Shepherds. The name "lethal white" is a misnomer, as this genetic condition is not lethal to the dogs; it is often the breeder who is lethal to the pups by culling them immediately after birth. Many consider the term "lethal white" to be derogatory.

Activities
Like other herding breeds, these dogs excel at many dog sports, especially herding also known as stockdog, dog agility, dock diving/dock jumping, obedience, rally, tracking, disc, and flyball. Herding instincts and trainability can be measured at noncompetitive instinct tests. Aussies that exhibit basic herding instincts can be trained to compete in ASCA stock dog trials or AKC herding events.

The dog has a stride in which its front and back legs cross over, making for an appearance of "on the edge" speed. The dogs instinctively use a "pounce" position to deal with cattle trying to kick them. They also have strong hips and legs, allowing for fast acceleration and high jumping, sometimes as high as 4 ft (1.3 m).

An Australian shepherd named Pockets is credited as being the oldest dog to earn a title in AKC history, having earned the Rally Novice title at the age of 15 years, 5 weeks.

See also
 Dogs portal
 List of dog breeds

References

Further reading

External links

Dog breeds originating in the United States
FCI breeds
Herding dogs
Dogs in the United States